Statistics of Úrvalsdeild in the 1976 season.

Overview
It was contested by 9 teams, and Valur won the championship. Valur's Ingi Björn Albertsson was the top scorer with 16 goals.

League standings

Results
Each team played every opponent once home and away for a total of 16 matches.

References

Úrvalsdeild karla (football) seasons
Iceland
Iceland
1976 in Icelandic football